George Eiferman (November 3, 1925 – February 12, 2002) was a notable figure in the sport of bodybuilding. Born in Philadelphia in 1925, he served in the Navy during World War II and entered into the sport of bodybuilding afterwards. He won the AAU Mr. America competition in 1948 and the Mr. Universe in 1962.

About
Eiferman was the son of Emanuel Eiferman and Frances Brasofsky Eiferman.In 1942, on his 17th birthday, Eiferman decided to join the US Navy. During this time, he began lifting weights seriously and ended up putting on 40 pounds of muscle by the time of his discharge on his 21st birthday in 1946. He then joined Fritshe's Gym in Philadelphia.

In 1947, just a year later, he won the Mr. Philadelphia competition which helped him advance into the Mr. America competition where he placed 5th. In April 1948, Eiferman won the title Mr. California. One month later, he won the Mr. America title. He later moved to California where he worked out regularly at Muscle Beach. During this time, Eiferman made a movie called The Devil's Sleep. The 1960s George of the Jungle cartoon character was created by the cook on his mine sweeper during the war who combined Eiferman's likeness and the Tarzan character.

Having a number of prestigious titles, he began traveling the country and giving speeches at high schools on living a healthy lifestyle and the benefits of weight training for the Nationwide School Assemblies of America organization.
 He came to my high school in Twin Falls, ID in 1953. He talked about sailors who didn't have enough strength to pull themselves up into a rescue boat in the war. He was not just about body building for show. Strength was important too. I went into the USMC with six months of weight lifting and it served me well, doubling my strength – inspired by his lecture back then. Few athletes did lifting in 1962, not even the Marine football team! My high school history teacher told us that George told him it took five years before he saw any difference in his build. Finishing his lecture, he demonstrated a pullover while on a bench with a 110-pound barbell. I know now that the pullovers make your lower pecs well defined, and he had them. I talked with him on the phone when he was in Las Vegas at his gym in 1995 and was able to thank him for putting me on the right course for being strong and healthy. 

Eiferman continued to lift, train, and compete and went on to win the Mr. Universe title in 1962. He also opened up his own gyms in Hawaii, Vista, California, and Las Vegas.

In the 1980s, Eiferman had a TV show called Take 5 for Fitness on Fox 5 in Las Vegas. As a trainer, nutritionist, and fitness ambassador, he had working relationships with weightlifters Steve Reeves, Lou Ferrigno, and Arnold Schwarzenegger as well as entertainers Mae West, Debbie Reynolds, Liz Taylor and Marilyn Monroe. He also helped train celebrities like Rock Hudson, Sylvester Stallone, and even Elvis in the early 1970s when he was having weight/health issues.

Eiferman was inducted into the IFBB Hall of Fame in 2000.

Family
George had a son, Shawn Eiferman, and a daughter named Leah Eiferman with his first wife Tobi Kestenberg Eiferman. George's cousin Teresa had a son named Barry and took the last name Cores when she got married. Now he has two third cousins named Madison and James Cores Sailer.

Death
On February 12, 2002, Eiferman died with his wife Bonita at his side.

Organizations
EIferman was a member of Mae West's revue in the 1950s.

References

4. Quote in italics: "He came to my high school..." is by William F. Marks who attended the presentation.

External links
George Eiferman Photos
Find A Grave

1925 births
2002 deaths
American bodybuilders
People associated with physical culture